Melanconium is a genus of fungi belonging to the family Melanconidaceae.

The genus has almost cosmopolitan distribution.

Species

Species:
 Melanconium abellinense 
 Melanconium acerinum 
 Melanconium acutum

References

Fungi